Peruvanam Mahadev Temple (Malayalam: പെരുവനം മഹാദേവക്ഷേത്രം) is a Shiva Temple situated in Peruvanam of Thrissur District, Kerala, India. The temple is said to be in existence with the origin of Kerala and the advent of Parasurama. It is one among the famous 108 Shiva temples in Kerala, and is the main temple of the old time Peruvanam village. It is surrounded by Bhadrakali and Subramanya temples on the west, a Sastha temple on the north, a Vishnu temple on the east and a Durga temple on the south.

Architecture
The temple stands on a 7-acre ground surrounded by a compound wall. The structure of Shrikovil (main shrine) is square-type which is very rare in Indian temples.

Gallery

See also
 Hindu temples in Thrissur Rural

References

External links

Shiva temples in Kerala
Tourist attractions in Thrissur
Hindu temples in Thrissur district
108 Shiva Temples